Wiggler may refer to:

Wiggler (Mario), the caterpillar-like creature in the Mario series of games
Wiggler (JTAG), a parallel port JTAG tool from the Macraigor Systems LLC
Wiggler (synchrotron), an insertion device for a synchrotron
Wiggler (tool), a centering tool in metalworking
Mosquito larva, or wiggler

See also
Wiggle (disambiguation)
Wriggler (disambiguation)